Villa Santa Rita de Catuna is a municipality and village within the General Ocampo Department of La Rioja Province in northwestern Argentina.

References

Populated places in La Rioja Province, Argentina